Frank Strahan  (2 July 18864 May 1976) was a senior Australian public servant. Between 1935 and 1949, he was Secretary of the Prime Minister's Department.

Life and career
Strahan was born in Fryerstown, Victoria on 2 July 1886.

In November 1935, Strahan was appointed Secretary of the Prime Minister's Department. In the role, he became the first member of the Commonwealth Public Service to attend Cabinet when he attended a meeting of the Third Menzies Ministry in July 1941.

In 1941 when the Department of External Territories was established (it was previously an office in the Prime Minister's Department), Strahan was named its Secretary. Strahan served in dual roles at the head of the Territories Department and the Prime Minister's Department until 1944, when J.R. Halligan was appointed to head the Department of External Territories.

Strahan retired in August 1949. He died on 4 May 1976 in Camberwell, and his body was cremated.

Awards
Whilst an Assistant Secretary at the Prime Minister's Department in June 1928, Strahan was made a Commander of the Order of the British Empire. In April 1935 he was appointed a Commander of the Royal Victorian Order.

References

1886 births
1976 deaths
Australian public servants
Australian Commanders of the Order of the British Empire
Secretaries of the Department of the Prime Minister and Cabinet
20th-century Australian public servants